Valley County is a county in the U.S. state of Montana. Valley County was created in 1893 with area partitioned from Dawson County. As of the 2020 census, the population was 7,578. Its county seat is Glasgow. It is located on the Canada–United States border with Saskatchewan.

Geography
It is Montana's fourth-largest county by total area.

Transportation

Major highways

  U.S. Highway 2
  Montana Highway 24
  Montana Highway 42
  Montana Highway 117
  Montana Secondary Highway 248

Bus
Glasgow and the greater Valley County region are served by a non-profit taxi/bus service called Valley Country Transit.

Adjacent counties and rural municipalities

 Phillips County - west
 Garfield County - south
 McCone County - south
 Roosevelt County - east
 Daniels County - east
 Rural Municipality (RM) of Mankota No. 45, Saskatchewan (SK) - north
 RM of Waverley No. 44, SK - north
 RM of Old Post No. 43, SK - north

National protected area
 Charles M. Russell National Wildlife Refuge (part)

Economy
Agriculture is the major economic activity of Valley County. The US Air Force operated Glasgow Air Force Base at St. Marie until 1976, which was a strong influence on the local economy until its closure.

Demographics

2000 census
As of the 2000 United States census, there were 7,675 people, 3,150 households, and 2,129 families living in the county. The population density was 2 people per square mile (1/km2). There were 4,847 housing units at an average density of 1.0/square mile (0.4/km2). The racial makeup of the county was 88.14% White, 0.13% Black or African American, 9.42% Native American, 0.25% Asian, 0.01% Pacific Islander, 0.26% from other races, and 1.79% from two or more races. 0.78% of the population were Hispanic or Latino of any race. 28.2% were of German, 24.0% Norwegian, 6.4% American, 6.0% English and 5.5% Irish ancestry.

There were 3,150 households, out of which 29.70% had children under the age of 18 living with them, 55.50% were married couples living together, 8.20% had a female householder with no husband present, and 32.40% were non-families. 29.30% of all households were made up of individuals, and 12.00% had someone living alone who was 65 years of age or older. The average household size was 2.38 and the average family size was 2.93.

The county population contained 25.10% under the age of 18, 6.00% from 18 to 24, 24.30% from 25 to 44, 25.60% from 45 to 64, and 19.00% who were 65 years of age or older. The median age was 42 years. For every 100 females there were 98.20 males. For every 100 females age 18 and over, there were 95.10 males.

The median income for a household in the county was $30,979, and the median income for a family was $39,044. Males had a median income of $27,233 versus $17,686 for females. The per capita income for the county was $16,246.  About 9.50% of families and 13.50% of the population were below the poverty line, including 15.40% of those under age 18 and 14.40% of those age 65 or over.

2010 census
As of the 2010 United States census, there were 7,369 people, 3,198 households, and 1,997 families living in the county. There were 4,879 housing units at an average density of 1.0/square mile (0.4/km2). The racial makeup of the county was 87.0% white, 9.8% American Indian, 0.5% Asian, 0.2% black or African American, 0.3% from other races, and 2.1% from two or more races. Those of Hispanic or Latino origin made up 1.2% of the population. In terms of ancestry, 33.4% were German, 27.9% were Norwegian, 12.4% were Irish, 10.3% were English, and 6.8% were American.

Of the 3,198 households, 26.9% had children under the age of 18 living with them, 50.3% were married couples living together, 8.0% had a female householder with no husband present, 37.6% were non-families, and 33.4% of all households were made up of individuals. The average household size was 2.26 and the average family size was 2.88. The median age was 46.4 years.

The median income for a household in the county was $42,050 and the median income for a family was $54,096. Males had a median income of $40,802 versus $30,272 for females. The per capita income for the county was $24,305. About 5.7% of families and 10.1% of the population were below the poverty line, including 17.0% of those under age 18 and 11.8% of those age 65 or over.

Politics
Valley County voters vote reliably Republican in national elections. Since 1964, they have selected the Democratic Party candidate only once (1992, due to strong showing by third-party candidate Ross Perot, which split the Republican voters).

Communities

City
 Glasgow (county seat)

Towns
 Fort Peck
 Nashua
 Opheim

Census-designated places
 Frazer
 Hinsdale
 St. Marie

Unincorporated communities

 Baylor
 Glentana
 Larslan
 Lustre
 Miles Crossing
 Oswego
 Park Grove
 Richland
 Roanwood
 Tampico
 Vandalia
 Whately
 Wheeler

Ghost towns
 Beaverton
 Genevieve
 Thoeny

Census Maps

See also
 Fort Peck Dam
 List of lakes in Valley County, Montana (A-L)
 List of lakes in Valley County, Montana (M-Z)
 List of mountains in Valley County, Montana
 National Register of Historic Places listings in Valley County, Montana

References

External links
 Official site
 Glasgow Area Chamber of Commerce

 
Montana counties on the Missouri River
1893 establishments in Montana
Populated places established in 1893